The 1948 Toledo Rockets football team was an American football team that represented Toledo University during the 1948 college football season. In their first season under head coach Skip Stahley, the Rockets compiled a 5–6 record, were outscored by their opponents by a combined total of 225 to 206, and defeated Oklahoma City, 27–14, in the third postseason Glass Bowl game.

On October 2, 1948, Chuck Hardy set a Toledo school record that still stands with a 100-yard kickoff return against John Carroll. On October 9, 1948, the Rockets renewed the Bowling Green–Toledo football rivalry after a 13-year hiatus. Toledo lost to Bowling Green, 21-6, in the 1948 game. During the 1948 season, a Toledo football game was televised for the first time on WSPD-TV13 (later WTVG). The 1948 team captains were Mardo Hamilton and Mike Carman.

Schedule

References

Toledo
Toledo Rockets football seasons
Toledo Rockets football